Your Network of Praise is a non-profit, listener supported, Christian broadcast radio network in the Northern United States, mainly in the state of Montana, but also in nearby states. Based in Havre, Montana, it broadcasts a mix of music and various Christian programs from a variety of sources. The original station, KXEI in Havre, started broadcasting in 1983.

Owned stations

Notes:

Tranlsators

References

External links

Moody Radio Official Site

American radio networks
Christian mass media companies
Christian radio stations in the United States
Radio broadcasting companies of the United States
Hill County, Montana
Radio stations established in 1983
1983 establishments in Montana